Evolution Fighting Championship is an American Kickboxing and mixed martial arts (MMA) promotion based in Wichita, Kansas. Evolution Fighting Championship was founded in 2015, by American professional mixed martial artist and bare-knuckle fighter David Rickels.

References

External links 

 Official EFC Site
 EFC profile on Sherdog
 EFC event results at Sherdog

Mixed martial arts organizations
Mixed martial arts in Kansas
Organizations based in Wichita, Kansas